The 1961 NCAA Skiing Championships were contested at the Middlebury College Snow Bowl in Hancock, Vermont at the eighth annual NCAA-sanctioned ski tournament to determine the individual and team national champions of men's collegiate alpine skiing, cross-country skiing, and ski jumping in the United States.

Denver, coached by Willy Schaeffler, captured their fifth national championship, the first since 1957, edging out host Middlebury in the team standings. This was the start of Denver's seven straight titles from 1961 through 1967.

Venue

This year's championships were held March 9–11 in Vermont at the Middlebury College Snow Bowl in Hancock. Middlebury College, located in nearby Middlebury, served as hosts.

These were the first NCAA Championships hosted by Middlebury, the second in Vermont (Northfield, 1955), and third in the East (Lyme, New Hampshire, 1958).

Team scoring

Individual events

Four events were held, which yielded seven individual titles.
Thursday: Downhill, Cross Country
Friday: Slalom
Saturday: Jumping

See also
List of NCAA skiing programs

References

NCAA Skiing Championships
NCAA Skiing Championships
NCAA Skiing Championships
NCAA Skiing Championships
NCAA Skiing Championships
NCAA Skiing Championships
NCAA Skiing Championships
Skiing in Vermont